This is a list of rediscovered films that, once thought lost, have since been discovered, in whole or in part. See List of incomplete or partially lost films and List of rediscovered film footage for films which were not wholly lost.

For a film that was not released before it was rediscovered, the year is when it was produced. The year is also italicized.

Silent films
Many films of the silent era have been lost. The Library of Congress estimates 75% of all silent films are lost forever. About 10,919 American silent films were produced, but only 2,749 of them still exist in some complete form, either as an original American 35mm version, a foreign release, or as a lower-quality copy.

1890s

1900s

1910s

1920s

1930s

Sound films

1930s

1940s

1950s

1960s

1970s

1980s

1990s

2000s

See also
 Bezhin Meadow, directed by Sergei Eisenstein, the production was halted in 1937 by the Soviet government; it was thought lost in World War II, but cuttings and partial prints were found and used to make a 35-minute "silent film slide show".
 Dawson Film Find, The Dawson Film Find (DFF) was the 1978 accidental discovery of 372 film titles preserved in 533 reels of silent-era nitrate films in the Klondike Gold Rush town of Dawson City. The list of lost films discovered can be viewed in this article, which are too numerous to list here.
List of lost films
List of incomplete or partially lost films
List of films cut over the director's opposition

References

External links
 List of Found media at The Lost Media Wiki.
 List of lost silent films at www.silentera.com
 Lost Films database

History of film
Rediscovered